Kim Mi-jung may refer to:
Kim Mi-jung (judoka, born 1971), South Korean judoka
Kim Mi-jung (judoka, born 1978), South Korean judoka
Kim Mi-jung (fencer) (born 1977), South Korean fencer
Kim Mi-jung (footballer) (born 1978)
Kim Mi-jung (racewalker) (born 1979), South Korean race walker
Kim Mi-jung (sport shooter) (born 1977), South Korean sport shooter